Happy Station may refer to:
The Happy Station Show, a shortwave radio show that ran from 1928 to 1995 on Radio Netherlands and from 2009 to 2020 from PCJ Radio in Taiwan. 
"Happy Station", a 1983 single by Fun Fun